Jalat Khan (born 10 October 1980) is an Afghan cricketer. He made his Twenty20 debut on 11 September 2020, for Speen Ghar Tigers in the 2020 Shpageeza Cricket League.

References

External links
 

1980 births
Living people
Afghan cricketers
Spin Ghar Tigers cricketers
Place of birth missing (living people)